The Algerian Cup also known the Republic Cup, is a football competition in Algeria, pitting regional teams against each other.  It was established in October 1962, three months after independence, and has been played yearly since then apart from 1990 and 1993.

The most successful clubs in this competition are USM Alger, CR Belouizdad, ES Setif and MC Alger with eight trophies for each. The record for consecutive wins in the competition is only two, several teams have achieved such USM Alger, CR Belouizdad, MC Oran, JS Kabylie and MC Algiers. However, ES Sétif are the only to achieve this twice. CR Belouizdad are the current title holders.

History 

Before the country's independence, there were several football competitions running on the same system as the Algeria Cup. When the France decided to develop the sport in the colonies, including football, settlers created a number of agencies for the promotion of the sport. To make it more attractive, several types of competitions' cutting  So were born.

 Colonial Period 

It already existed at that time, in the late fifties, a similar competition called "Algeria Cup football", which was played solely between Algerian clubs but settlers. To get there, one must understand that this was the result of a long process of both sports, political and historical.

When football appeared in North Africa, it was not structured enough for organizing major football competitions. At the beginning of, small football challenges appear 1904 and 1905 and criterium in 1911 and 1912. These small competitions désignèrent unofficial champions because regulatory bodies came much later in France (USFSA in 1913 and FFFA in 1919) where chaos reigned for several football federations coexisted.

North Africa was then divided into five regions each had a football league. So we had the Morocco Football League Association or LMFA for Morocco; the League of Oran Football Association or LOFA for Oran ut; the League Algiers Football Association or LAFA for Algiers ois; the Constantine Ligue de Football Association or LCFA for Constantine; and Tunisian Football League Association or LTFA for Tunisia.

Each of these leagues organized football championships (between 1920 and 1959) on different levels including the highest honor was called Division (DH ). Meanwhile, a larger football competition appears during the year 1921 called North African Championship. This competition was governed by the Union of North African football leagues created the same year, and included all the champions of honor division of North African football leagues. The winner was crowned "Champion of North Africa" and saw himself put an art object. It retained its trophy season and saw the honor of defending his due by being automatically qualified for the next edition accompanied by another club in the league.

 Regional colonial cups 
 The Oran Cup (1926-1957) 

The Oran Cup was a competition organized by the League of Oran Football Association.

 The football Forconi Cup (1946-1957) 
The Forconi Cup was a competition organized by the League Algiers Football Association model  cut , and departmental or regional dimension. At that time Algiers was a Department French covering more than 170.000 km2 including the cities of Algiers of Aumale of Blida of Médéa of Miliana of Orléansville and Tizi Ouzou. Founded in 1946 at the end of World War II, this competition took place until 1957. This was the only dimension of cutting departmental football in North Africa in the colonial era. The competition was named Cup Forconi in memory of Edmond Forconi, Vice-President of the Algiers League at this time, after he died as a result of his war wounds. This departmental cut was also very popular because it concerned all teams affiliated to the Algiers League whatever their levels. From 1946 until 1957, the winner of this competition will receive a trophy saw that he kept one season and also had the honor of defending his due but at the stage of final quarters of the competition the next edition. If this system was designed in this way is that the reason was obvious; the winner was also referred to the North African Cup, thus allowing him to devote himself fully to this competition without worrying about the preliminary rounds for the next edition of the Forconi Cup. The competition will disappear as a result of the disappearance of the North African Cup combined with the independence of the Morocco and Tunisia during 1956.

 Algerian Cup (1957-1962) 

 After independence 

The 5 July 1962, Algeria gained independence after seven and a half years of war. This is the end of an entire sporting world with the end of football competitions organized by 'settlers'. The clubs 'settlers' stopped in their towers and the clubs  Muslim  respawn. The page of football history colonial turned definitively in North Africa as Algeria, another begins, the football Algerian.

 Creating the Algerian Cup 

At independence, many football tournaments are held around the country in order to celebrate the country's independence. Behind the scenes, we are active as can be to organize what became the country's first football championship. It was still only a regional championship called "Criterium". All the football system in Algeria of rethinking. However, the main regional leagues were kept, which were renamed Western Region (former League of Oran), Central Region (former League of Algiers) and East Region (former League Constantine). Each of these leagues organized the winners of the playoffs at the end of  play-off  to qualify for the finals to determine the first champion of Algeria nationwide.

Alongside the championship, the young Algerian Football Federation chaired by Dr. Mohand Amokrane Maouche, launches another nationwide competition. This was to allow all affiliated clubs to compete in a competition type cutting'' nationally. It is based on his neighbors and on what was already being done elsewhere in the world, especially in Europe, was born the first Algerian Cup.

Algerian Cup winners and finalists

The record for most wins of the tournament by a club is 8, held by USM Alger, CR Belouizdad, MC Alger and ES Sétif

six clubs have won consecutive Algerian Cups on more than one occasion: ES Sétif (1963, 1964 and 1967, 1968), CR Belouizdad (1969, 1970), MC Oran (1984, 1985), JS Kabylie (1992, 1994), USM Alger (2003, 2004), MC Alger (2006, 2007).

Five clubs have won the Algerian Cup as part of a League and Cup double, namely CR Belouizdad (1966, 1969, 1970), ES Setif (1968, 2012), MC Alger (1976), JS Kabylie (1977, 1986) and USM Alger (2003).

Mahieddine Meftah holds the record for most Algerian Cup winner's medals, with seven: Two with JS Kabylie (1992 and 1994) and five with USM Alger (1997, 1999, 2001, 2003 and 2004). The record for most winner's medals for a manager is Abdelkader Amrani Four times with four different clubs they are WA Tlemcen (1998), ASO Chlef (2005), MO Béjaïa (2015) and CR Belouizdad (2019).

Performance by club

Medals
Each club in the final receives 30 winners or runners-up medals to be distributed among players, staff, and officials.

Sponsorship

Finals venues and host cities

Records

Most common finals matchups

Individual records

Players
(at least 5 titles)

See also
 Algerian Ligue Professionnelle 1
 Algerian Super Cup

External links
 RSSSF cup history
 Algeria Coupe Nationale - Hailoosport.com (Arabic)
 Algeria Coupe Nationale - Hailoosport.com

 
National association football cups
Recurring sporting events established in 1962
1
1962 establishments in Algeria